Sandia High School (SHS) is a Public High School located in the northeast heights of Albuquerque, New Mexico. It is a member of the Albuquerque Public Schools district. The current enrollment is 1,776.



History
The school opened in 1958 and was originally constructed to hold between 1,800-2,000 students at a cost of $1.3 million dollars. The smaller Yucca school, located east of the main building, was completed in 1959 to house elementary students. The Yucca school was phased out as an elementary school in 1974 due to low enrollment, and was used as an annex to Sandia. 

The originally proposed mascot name was the Sandia Satans, which prompted negative reactions from the community.  Thereafter, the mascot name was changed to Matadors, after a vote which included Thunderbirds and Road Runners.  A Matador sculpture was placed in the student commons area in 1979.

In the late 1970s, the school reached a record student population for the state of New Mexico.
This led to the approval and construction of a newer facility, La Cueva High School, in the early 1980s. 

As of 2013, Sandia High School is home to the International Baccalaureate program. 

Sandia's current principal is Camille Gonzales as of September 2021.

Athletics 
The first athletic win in school history was a 26-0 football victory over Española Valley High School on September 20th, 1958. At this time, Sandia still had the Satan as the mascot. It was a week later that Sandia officially changed the mascot to the Matador.

SHS competes in the New Mexico Activities Association (NMAA). For 2022/2023-2023/2024, the NMAA realigned the state's districts and classifications. Sandia competes in 5A in every sport except football. Football is still a 6A classification.

State titles

Boys
Baseball: 1968, 1974, 1979, 1980
Basketball: 1962, 1967, 1985
Football: 1976
Soccer: 1982, 1992
Golf: 1966, 1968, 1975, 1977, 2009
Hockey: (Non NMAA) 2001
Tennis: 2013
Track and Field: 1976, 1977
Volleyball: (Non NMAA) 2022
Wrestling: 1960, 1972, 1973, 1979, 1980, 1981
Cross Country: 2000

Girls
Volleyball: 1973, 2013, 2017
Soccer: 1985 (co-champions), 1996, 2000, 2008, 2018
Basketball: 1996, 2001, 2010, 2017
Golf: 2004, 2006, 2008, 2009, 2010, 2012
Softball: 1978
Tennis: 2002, 2003, 2004, 2005, 2019
Cheerleading: 2008
Gymnastics: 1986, 1987, 1988, 1989, 1990
Dance/Drill: 1971, 1973, 1975, 1976, 1977, 1980, 1987, 1988, 1991, 1992

Alumni
Janet Napolitano, former US Secretary of Homeland Security and Arizona Governor
Robert Mercer, hedge fund CO-CEO of Renaissance Technologies, who played a key role in Brexit and Trump campaigns
Gary Johnson, former Governor of New Mexico and 2012 Presidential candidate
Brendan Donnelly, former MLB player (Anaheim Angels, Boston Red Sox, Cleveland Indians, Florida Marlins, Pittsburgh Pirates)
David Addington, former Vice President Dick Cheney's Chief of Staff
Madolyn Smith, movie and television actress 
Heidi Swedberg, movie and television actress
 Richard Angulo, coach and former player in NFL
 Gary Suiter, professional basketball player and first person from Albuquerque to play in the NBA

 DeAndre Lansdowne, professional basketball player

References

External links
 Sandia High School Homepage

High schools in Albuquerque, New Mexico
Public high schools in New Mexico
International Baccalaureate schools in New Mexico